Hache may refer to:

 Hache (Ochtum), a river of Lower Saxony, Germany, headstream of the Ochtum
 French destroyer Hache, a destroyer built for the French Navy in the first decade of the 20th century
 Hache (TV series), a 2019 Spanish television series

People with the surname
 Alain Haché (born 1970), experimental physicist and professor at the University of Moncton, Canada
 Cloé Hache (born 1997), French swimmer
 Emma Haché (born 1979), Canadian writer of Acadian descent
 Eva Hache (born 1972), Spanish comedian, actress and television show hostess
 Gérard Haché (1925–2017), Canadian politician
 Jean-François Hache (1730-1796), French ébéniste
 Thomas Hache (1664-1747), French ébéniste

See also
 Hacha (disambiguation)
 Martín (hache), a 1997 Spanish and Argentine film